Kabhie Kabhie may refer to:

 Kabhie Kabhie (1976 film), a Bollywood film
 "Kabhi Kabhie Mere Dil Mein", the film's title song
 Kabhie Kabhie (1997 TV series), a Star Plus television drama directed by Mahesh Bhatt
 Kabhie Kabhie (2003 TV series), a Zee TV television series
 Kabhi Kabhi (2013 TV series),  a Pakistani drama broadcast on ARY Digital